Rogers: The Musical is a fictional Broadway musical in the Marvel Cinematic Universe (MCU) media franchise, centered on the life of Steve Rogers / Captain America. A musical number from the musical entitled "Save the City" was recorded for the 2021 Marvel Studios Disney+ miniseries Hawkeye, and garnered a mixed response from viewers. The musical was conceived by Hawkeye head writer Jonathan Igla, while "Save the City" was written by Marc Shaiman and Scott Wittman. Multiple Easter eggs referencing the musical have since been added to several MCU properties. "Save the City" was performed live at the 2022 D23 Expo, and a one-act version of the musical will debut at Disney California Adventure in 2023.

Premise 
Rogers: The Musical chronicles the life of Steve Rogers / Captain America from his origins in the 1940s until the events of the film Avengers: Endgame (2019), based on information known to the public in the Marvel Cinematic Universe (MCU). It contains intentional plot inaccuracies such as the presence of Scott Lang / Ant-Man during the Battle of New York.

Background 
Jonathan Igla, the head writer of the Marvel Studios Disney+ miniseries Hawkeye (2021), first conceived of an idea for a fictional Broadway musical centered on Rogers after noticing a billboard for the Broadway musical Hamilton (2015). A real-life Broadway musical based on the Marvel Comics character Captain America had previously been in development in 1985, but never came to fruition. Igla then imagined what it would feel like to live in the MCU and how people would feel inspired by Rogers to create a musical based on him to inspire and entertain audiences. He considered the musical as a way to introduce emotional and psychological information through something disguised as funny, exciting, and surprising, like Clint Barton / Hawkeye's grief and guilt over Natasha Romanoff / Black Widow's death. Director Rhys Thomas then pitched the idea as a joke to Marvel Studios president Kevin Feige, who was enthused and quickly gave the go-ahead.

"Save the City"

Hawkeye (2021) 
Feige had kept in contact with composer Marc Shaiman ever since both met in an event promoting Mary Poppins Returns (2018) for the Academy of Motion Picture Arts and Sciences, and decided to enlist him for Hawkeye due to his Broadway credentials. Shaiman and Scott Wittman then wrote a musical number from the fictional musical entitled "Save the City", which Hollywood Records and Marvel Music released as a digital single on November 24, 2021, the day of the series' premiere. It is also included in the Hawkeye: Vol. 2 (Episodes 4–6) (Original Soundtrack) album. Shaiman and Wittman envision the song as the final number of the musical's first act. At Marvel's suggestion, the song was set during the Battle of New York, as depicted in the film The Avengers (2012), which the composers agreed was a good moment to finish a musical's first act. Both immediately had the idea of New Yorkers requesting the Avengers' help, and wrote a verse and a chorus. While Shaiman normally sings while recording demos for his songs, he thought the difficult notes of "Save the City" would not allow him to do so, and so decided to invite Broadway veteran Adam Pascal. Wittman said the song tried to reflect New York City during the COVID-19 pandemic, "this kind of wishing that maybe the Avengers would come and take COVID away". He also added that it had to serve two purposes; be entertaining and make Barton feel uncomfortable. "Save the City" was recorded before the stage performance was filmed in Atlanta, as COVID restrictions prevented the performers other than Pascal and Ty Taylor from traveling along.

A portion of "Save the City" is shown in "Never Meet Your Heroes", the first episode of Hawkeye. After numerous references to Rogers: The Musical in subsequent episodes, "Save of City" is shown in full during the mid-credits scene of "So This Is Christmas?", the series finale. The cast of the performance includes Pascal and Taylor as the two leads, Tom Feeney as Rogers, Aaron Nedrick as Tony Stark / Iron Man, Jason Scott McDonald as Thor, Harris Turner as Bruce Banner / Hulk, Meghan Manning as Romanoff, Avery Gillham as Barton, Jordan Chin as Loki, Nico DeJesus as Lang, and several extras as Chitauri warriors. Other performers include Rory Donovan, Derek Klena, Bonnie Milligan, Christopher Sieber, and Shayna Steele. Fra Fee, who portrays Kazimierz "Kazi" Kazimierczak in the series, was disappointed that he could not participate in the musical's production.

2022 D23 Expo 

"Save the City" was performed live at Marvel Studios' D23 Expo panel on September 10, 2022, featuring 22 performers and a six-piece rhythm section led by Shaiman.

Disney California Adventure 

Shortly after Hawkeye release, executive producer Trinh Tran expressed interest in a real-life version of Rogers: The Musical, while Shaiman and Wittman expressed interest in writing a full-length version of the musical. In February 2023, it was announced that a one-act stage show version of Rogers: The Musical would be performed at the Hyperion Theater at Disney California Adventure for a limited time.

Reception

Critical response 
Dais Johnston of Inverse enjoyed seeing the MCU from the perspective of its citizens, praising Rogers: The Musical use of "meta-commentary". Rachel Leishman of The Mary Sue wrote that the musical scene in Hawkeye was "so bad it's good", highlighting Barton's reaction to seeing Romanoff's portrayal. Vulture Jackson McHenry hoped that a potential second season of Hawkeye would answer his questions about the musical. Brady Langmann of Esquire predicted that Rogers: The Musical would lead to an MCU musical film. Mashable Alexis Nedd envisioned a full-length version of the musical as opening with a flashback of a young Rogers and ending with him embarking on a new mission.

Audience reception 
Upon the release of the trailer for Hawkeye, viewers were drawn to the fictional musical, with many noting its similarities to Hamilton. Some viewers expressed disappointment at "Save the City" being the mid-credits scene of "So This Is Christmas?", a response Shaiman described as "bittersweet". Thomas stated that he felt "conflicted" when Marvel decided not to include a mid-credits scene that set up future MCU properties.

References in other media 
Billboards and posters for Rogers: The Musical appear as Easter eggs in the films Spider-Man: No Way Home (2021) and Doctor Strange in the Multiverse of Madness (2022), as well as the Disney+ miniseries She-Hulk: Attorney at Law (2022). A poster advertising a West End production of Rogers: The Musical is intended to appear in the upcoming Disney+ miniseries Secret Invasion (2023). An advertisement for the musical could also be seen on a fictitious The Daily Bugle newspaper sold at a newsstand in Manhattan's Upper East Side, as part of a viral marketing campaign in promotion for No Way Home.

See also 
 Spider-Man: Turn Off the Dark, a 2011 Broadway musical based on the Marvel Comics

References

External links 
 Full lyrics of "Save the City" via TVLine

2021 musicals
Amusement park attractions introduced in 2023
Fictional elements introduced in 2021
Fictional musicals
Hawkeye (2021 TV series)
Hollywood Land
Hollywood Records singles
Marvel Cinematic Universe features
Marvel Cinematic Universe music
Musicals based on television series
Television music
Walt Disney Parks and Resorts entertainment